The 2019–20 season was Albacete Balompié's 80th season in existence and the club's third consecutive season in the second division of Spanish football. In addition to the domestic league, Albacete participated in this season's edition of the Copa del Rey. The season covered the period from 1 July 2019 to 20 July 2020.

Players

Current squad

Reserve team

Out on loan

Transfers

Pre-season and friendlies

Competitions

Overview

Segunda División

League table

Results summary

Results by round

Matches
The fixtures were revealed on 4 July 2019.

Copa del Rey

References

External links

Albacete Balompié seasons
Albacete